Head Carrier is the sixth studio album by the American alternative rock band the Pixies, released on September 30, 2016 on Pixiesmusic and PIAS. Produced by Tom Dalgety, and recorded at RAK Studios in London, the album is the first to feature new band member Paz Lenchantin on bass guitar, who joined the band in 2014 to tour in support of its previous album, Indie Cindy.

The album's title references a cephalophore, a saint carrying his own head, more specifically St. Denis of Paris.

Background 
Production started around late 2015 after finding a new producer, Tom Dalgety (replacing previous producer Gil Norton, who had worked on the Pixies last four albums). The band met with him as they were recording demos for the followup of their 2014 album Indie Cindy. Previously they had debuted a number of songs live that they were testing as potential tracks for their next album. Such tracks included "Super Lecker", "O' Little Cloud", and "Down to Tulom".

This album marks the first full appearance of bassist Paz Lenchantin (former A Perfect Circle and Zwan), after replacing previous bassist Kim Deal, who left the band in 2013. Lenchantin had previously been featured on the bonus track "Women of War" (a vinyl bonus track off of Indie Cindy), as well as live tracks for the deluxe edition of the same album. Lenchantin had previously been the touring bassist, but was promoted to full-time member starting with this album. She also has a writing credit and lead vocals for the song "All I Think About Now", which was written about Kim Deal and takes on the form of a thank-you letter.

The album was officially announced on July 6, 2016 with the release of its first single "Um Chagga Lagga". This was followed up by a second single, "Talent", on August 17, 2016. The whole album was streamed on NPR starting on September 22, 2016.

Track listing

Personnel 
Credits adapted from the album's liner notes.

 Black Francis – lead vocals, guitar
 Joey Santiago – lead guitar
 Paz Lenchantin – bass guitar, backing vocals, lead vocals on "All I Think About Now"
 David Lovering – drums

Technical 
Tom Dalgety – production, engineering, mixing
Rob Brinkman – engineering assistant
Vaughan Oliver – art direction, design
Joshua Price – design assistance
Ian Pollock – illustrations

Charts

Year-end charts

References 

2016 albums
Pixies (band) albums
PIAS Recordings albums
Albums produced by Tom Dalgety